Fatafeat (Arabic: فتافيت), is a Middle Eastern food and lifestyle television channel owned by Takhayal Entertainment, which is part of Warner Bros. Discovery

On , Fatafeat stopped broadcasting as a free-to-air channel and started being encrypted on satellite provider beIN under its "Top Entertainment" and "Complete" packages.

References

External links
 Official site

Arabic-language television stations
Television stations in the United Arab Emirates
Food and drink television
Mass media in Dubai